Kenneth Frank Phillips (23 September 1943 – 4 June 1995) was an Australian rules footballer who played with South Melbourne in the Victorian Football League (VFL).

References

External links
 
 

1943 births
1995 deaths
Australian rules footballers from Victoria (Australia)
Sydney Swans players